Geronimo Albertini was a Roman Catholic prelate who served as Bishop of Avellino e Frigento (1545–1548).

Biography
On 19 January 1545, Geronimo Albertini was appointed during the papacy of Pope Paul III as Bishop of Avellino e Frigento. He served as Bishop of Avellino e Frigento until his resignation in 1548.

See also 
Catholic Church in Italy

References

External links and additional sources
 (for Chronology of Bishops) 
 (for Chronology of Bishops) 

16th-century Italian Roman Catholic bishops
Bishops appointed by Pope Paul III